Aykol Township (Uyghur: , Айкол; also Ayikule) is a township in Poskam County (Zepu County) in the Kashgar Prefecture of Xinjiang, in northwestern China.

History
In 1961, Aykol Commune was established.

In 1984, Aykol Commune became Aykol Township.

In August 2013 at the end of Ramadan, violence erupted in Aykol.

On April 15, 2019, a farming cooperative was established in Bashösteng (Bashiwusitang).

Administrative Divisions
Aykol includes fourteen villages and 69 village committees:
 Ittipaq (Tuanjie;  / ) 
 Pichanchi (Piqiangqi;  / ) 
 Qutay (Kutayi;  / ) 
 Paxtichi (Paheteqi;  / ) 
 Zerepshan (Zelepushan;  / )
 Bashösteng (Bashiwusitang;  / )
 Töwenghongrat (Tuowanwengrete;  / )
 Talqichi (Talekeqi;  / ) 
 Yuqirighongrat (Bashiwengrete;  / )
 Nurbagh (Nu'erbage;  / )
 Küybagh (Kuyibage;  / ) 
 Chinarliq (Qina'erleke;  / )
 Ayköl (Ayikule;  / ) 
 Aydingköl (Ayidingkule;  / )

As of 2009, the villages of Aykol were: (Mandarin Chinese pinyin-derived names)
Xiawuqituoma (下乌其托玛村), Piqiangqi (皮羌其村), Kutayi (库塔依村), Paheteqi (帕合特其村), Wulukeming (乌鲁克明村), Xiayidan (夏依旦村), Xiawengrete (下翁热特村), Talekeqi (塔勒克其村), Shangwengrete (上翁热特村), Ahetaqi (阿合塔其村), Kuiyibage (奎依巴格村), Shangkulegan (上库勒干村), Ayikule (阿依库勒村), Wuqituoma (乌其托玛村)

Economy
A typical farming township, Aykol has an area of 3.65 million mu of cultivated land and is a major producer of grain, such as rice, wheat and corn, cotton, fruits and medicinal herbs.

In 2018, the township cultivated 12,000 mu of jujubes with an average of above 450 jin produced per mu.

Demographics

As of 1997, the population of Aykol was 75.8% Uyghur.

References

Populated places in Xinjiang
Township-level divisions of Xinjiang